Pícara Sonhadora (The Mischievous Dreamer) is a Brazilian telenovela that was produced and aired by SBT from August 27 to December 27, 2001. It is a remake of the Mexican telenovela La Pícara Soñadora.

Cast

References

External links 
 

2001 telenovelas
2001 Brazilian television series debuts
2001 Brazilian television series endings
Brazilian telenovelas
Sistema Brasileiro de Televisão telenovelas
Brazilian television series based on Mexican television series
Portuguese-language telenovelas